Henry Alexander Wise Wood (March 1, 1866 - April 9, 1939) was an American inventor of a high speed newspaper press and member of the Naval Consulting Board. His father Fernando Wood was mayor of New York City and a Democratic Party member of Congress, and his uncle Benjamin Wood was also a Democratic member of Congress. He married Elizabeth Ogden. In 1915 he joined the Naval Consulting Board. He died on April 9, 1939.

References

External links 

Henry Alexander Wise Wood patents
	

1866 births
1939 deaths
American inventors
Naval Consulting Board